Kasia Redisz is a Polish art historian, curator and museum director. She is the artistic director of KANAL - Centre Pompidou. From 2010 to 2015, she worked as an assistant curator at the Tate Modern. In 2014, she became senior curator of Tate Liverpool. She was a curator at Warsaw’s Museum of Modern Art from 2005 to 2007, and the director of the Open Arts Project from 2008 to 2015. With Mihnea Mircan, she is the co-curator of the 4th Art Encounters Biennial, Timisoara. Redzisz received an MA in Art History at the University of Warsaw in 2007.

References 

Polish art historians
Living people
Polish curators
Museum administrators
Year of birth missing (living people)
Polish women curators